Federal Highway 85 (Carretera Federal 85) connects Mexico City with the Mexico–United States border at Nuevo Laredo, Tamaulipas. Highway 85 runs through Monterrey, Nuevo León; Ciudad Victoria, Tamaulipas; Ciudad Valles, San Luis Potosí; and Pachuca, Hidalgo. It ends at the intersection of Highway 95 in the San Pedro area of Mexico City. Highway 85 is the original route of the Pan-American Highway from the border to the capital as well as the Inter-American Highway.

Through most of Tamaulipas and Nuevo León, it is a freeway and is essentially a southern continuation of U.S. Interstate 35. Highway 85 has two alternate toll routes (Autopistas); both are named Carretera Federal 85D; one is from Nuevo Laredo to Monterrey (123.1 kilometers MXN$177) and Pachuca to Mexico City (45.8 kilometers MXN$33). Highway 85D has wider lanes, offers a more direct route, and is continuously being repaired and repaved.

Major highway intersections

Description

Nuevo Laredo, Tamaulipas, to Monterrey, Nuevo León

Federal Highway 85 is a 6-lane divided unrestricted access road from Nuevo Laredo to Monterrey. Gateway to the Americas International Bridge in Nuevo Laredo is the highway's starting point. In Nuevo Laredo MFH 85 is also known as Reforma Avenue passing through Downtown Nuevo Laredo and Nuevo Laredo's main commercial districts and Industrial Parks. At kilometer 26 there is a Mexican customs stop known as Garita Kilómetro 26. All vehicles exiting the border area are required to stop for inspection and proof of citizenship is required. The highway is divided into Highway 85 (known as la libre; the "free road") and the toll Highway 85D (known as la cuota) whose starting point at the World Trade International Bridge in Nuevo Laredo then connects with MFH85 then splitting again after the Mexican check point. At about midway between Nuevo Laredo and Monterrey, Highway 85 crosses the Sierra Madre Oriental mountain range (at the Paso de Mamulique).  Highway 85 passes through several cities and small towns including:

Nuevo Laredo
Sabinas Hidalgo
Salinas Victoria
Escobedo
San Nicolás de los Garza
Monterrey

Monterrey, Nuevo León to Ciudad Victoria, Tamaulipas
Federal Highway 85 in Monterrey is mainly a 6-lane divided unrestricted access road. In Monterrey the highway intersects various highways and loops. At the southern end it becomes a 4-lane divided highway leading to Linares, Nuevo León.  From Linares to Ciudad Victoria the highway becomes a 2 lane road. Highway 85 passes through several cities and small towns including:
Montemorelos
Linares
Allende
Santiago
Villagrán
Hidalgo
Ciudad Victoria

Ciudad Victoria, Tamulipas to Ciudad Mante, Tamaulipas
Federal Highway 85 is a 2 lane divided highway from Ciudad Victoria to Ciudad Mante, Tamaulipas. Highway 85 passes through mainly rural areas.

Ciudad Mante, Tamaulipas to Ciudad Valles, San Luis Potosí
Federal Highway 85 is a 2 lane divided highway from Ciudad Mante, Tamaulipas to Ciudad Valles, San Luis Potosí. Highway 85 passes through mainly rural areas.

Ciudad Valles, San Luis Potosí to Pachuca, Hidalgo
Federal Highway 85 is a 2 lane divided highway from Ciudad Valles, San Luis Potosí to Actopan, Hidalgo. From Actopan to Pachuca, Hidalgo it becomes a 4 lane divided highway. Highway 85 passes through several cities and small towns including:
Tamazunchale
Axtla de Terrazas
Ixmiquilpan
Actopan
Pachuca

Pachuca, Hidalgo to Mexico City
Federal Highway 85 is a 4 lane divided highway from Pachuca, Hidalgo to Mexico City. Highway 85 passes through several cities and small towns including:
Villanueva
Ecatepec
Teotihuacán de Arista
Mexico City

See also
List of Mexican Federal Highways
List of Mexican autopistas

References

085
085
Transportation in Hidalgo
Transportation in Mexico City
Transportation in Nuevo León
Transportation in San Luis Potosí
Transportation in the State of Mexico
Transportation in Tamaulipas
Ciudad Victoria
1936 establishments in Mexico